Angela Fimmano (born 22 April 1992) is an Australian soccer player who played for Australian W-League team Adelaide United.

Personal life
She is of Italian descent on her father's side. She was influenced by her brother to take up a career in football and comes from a sporting family; two of her uncles and her grandfather were all footballers themselves. In 2004, Fimmano, and then-future A-League player Terry Antonis, won a Seven Network competition where they travelled to Spain to receive coaching from David Beckham. In 2007, Fimmano received a South Australian Sports Institute (SASI) soccer scholarship. Fimmano was the Adelaide United face of the W-League's "Football with Style" advertising campaign ahead of the 2009 W-League season.

References 

Australian women's soccer players
Living people
Adelaide United FC (A-League Women) players
1992 births
Women's association football midfielders
Australian people of Italian descent
South Australian Sports Institute soccer players
20th-century Australian women
21st-century Australian women